Älgarna-Härnösand IF is a Swedish football team from Härnösand currently playing in Division 2 Norrland. The club is affiliated to the Ångermanlands Fotbollförbund. The club was originally called IF Älgarna before changing name during the annual meeting on 29 March 2020.

History
In the early years, the club also had a bandy section. the club dominated bandy in Västernorrland in the 1920s and 1930s, winning the district championship in this sport in 1922, 1923, 1924, 1925, 1928, 1929, 1930, 1931, 1932, 1933, 1934, 1935, and then again in 1946.

The club played at their highest level in Division II, which was then the second tier of Swedish football, in seasons 1953/1954-1954/1955, 1959 and 1960. In 1941 and again in 1952 the club lost the final of the Norrland championship.

Season to season

Attendances

In recent seasons the club have had the following average attendances:

Staff and board members
 President: Christer Solgevik
 Vice President: Håkan Lönnefors
 Treasurer : Bo Westin

References

External links
 Official website

Association football clubs established in 1919
Bandy clubs established in 1919
Football clubs in Västernorrland County
Defunct bandy clubs in Sweden
Sport in Härnösand
1919 establishments in Sweden